The 1921 Franklin & Marshall football team was an American football team that represented Franklin & Marshall College during the 1921 college football season. The team compiled a 6–1–2 record and outscored opponents by a total of 166 to 48.  John B. Price was the team's head coach.

Schedule

References

Franklin and Marshall
Franklin & Marshall Diplomats football seasons
Franklin and Marshall football